Mehmet Kuşman (1940, Van) He is one of the 12 people in the world who can write and read Urartian.

Early life 
Mehmet Kuşman was born in Van as the child of a farmer family. After finishing primary school, He worked as a farmer with his father until he went to the army. He is married and has eleven children.

Career  
After completing his military service. Located on the Van, Hakkari highway and BC. In the years 764-734 He started to work as a guard in the Çavuştepe Castle built by the Urartians. Despite being a primary school graduate, He started to learn the Urartian alphabet from the people who came to the region for excavation work and the books they gave. He traveled to many cities of Iran, Armenia, Syria and Turkey to learn Urartian and learned the Urartian alphabet in three years. He has been invited to symposiums in Ankara several times by the Ministry of Culture and Tourism of the Republic of Turkey. Mehmet Kuşman was invited to the United States by the Governor of the State of California. Although he was offered a 14-year visa in exchange for one year of Urartian education, this offer was rejected by Mehmet Kuşman's family. Mehmet Kuşman retired from Çavuştepe Castle, Despite this, it continues its activities there with the offer of the Ministry of Culture and Tourism of the Republic of Turkey. As part of his duty, Mehmet Kuşman guides the tourists who come to the castle and translates Urartian inscriptions for them.

Urartian Chechen claim

İlber Ortaylı claimed in one of his seminars that the Urartians were Chechens. Ortaylı mentioned Mehmet Kușman in a part of the book he wrote and claimed that the Urartians had nothing to do with the Armenians, contrary to what is known. Mehmet Kuşman's learning of Urartu led to the claim that Urartu is related to Chechen. Mehmet Kuşman's learning of the Urartian language led to the emergence of the claim that the Urartian language is related to Chechen.

Documentary 
The documentary Son Urartu (Last Urartian) about Mehmet Kuşman was made by DW Turkish

Awards 
“Troy Special Award”

References 

1940 births
Turkish people
Living people
People from Van, Turkey
Linguists of Hurro-Urartian languages
Linguists from Turkey